The 2019–20 Liga FPD season, also known as Liga Promérica for sponsorship reasons, is the 99th season since its establishment. The tournament is divided into two championships, the Apertura and Clausura, each in an identical format and each contested by 12 teams. 

The Voit Loxus is the official match ball of the tournament. San Carlos are the defending champions, after defeating Saprissa in the Clausura 2019 tournament.

Teams and Structure Changes
A total of 12 teams will contest the league, including 11 sides from the 2018–19 season, one team promoted from the Liga de Ascenso.

Jicaral were promoted for the first time to the Liga FPD after defeating Guanacasteca in the Liga de Ascenso final, thus replacing Carmelita in the Liga FPD.

Like the previous season, the league has the following playoff format. The top 4 teams in the regular season will progress to a two-legged knockout tournament. If the same team that wins the regular season wins the playoff, that team wins the season championship immediately. Should a different team win the playoff than won the regular season, those two teams will meet in a two-legged Grand Final for the season championship.

Personnel, kits and Stadia

Note: Table lists in alphabetical order.

Apertura
The Apertura tournament will be played in the second half of 2019, starting on 20 July.

Regular season
The regular season began on 20 July 2019 and ended on 20 November 2019.

Standings

Results

Playoffs

Semifinals

First legs

Second legs

Finals

First leg

Second leg

Grand final
If the regular season winners are unable to win the playoffs, a double-legged final will be played against the playoffs winner in order to determine the champions of the Apertura tournament. The team with the better accumulated record over the regular season and playoffs will host the second leg.

First leg

Second leg

Clausura
The Clausura 2020 season began in January 2020.

Regular season

Standings

Results

Playoffs

Semifinals

First legs

Second legs

Finals

First leg

Second leg

Aggregate table

List of foreign players in the league 
This is a list of foreign players in the 2019–20 season. The following players:

 Have played at least one game for the respective club.
 Have not been capped for the Costa Rica national football team on any level, independently from the birthplace

A new rule was introduced this season, that clubs can have four foreign players per club and can only add a new player if there is an injury or a player is released and it's before the close of the season transfer window. 

 (player released during the Apertura season)
 (player released between the Apertura and Clausura seasons)
 (player released during the Clausura season)

References

Liga FPD seasons
Costa Rica
2019–20 in Costa Rican football